Alexandra Schreiber (born 13 April 1963) is a German former judoka. She competed in the women's middleweight event at the 1992 Summer Olympics.

References

External links
 

1963 births
Living people
German female judoka
Olympic judoka of Germany
Judoka at the 1992 Summer Olympics
Sportspeople from Regensburg
20th-century German women
21st-century German women